Acaulospora longula is a species of fungi in the family Acaulosporaceae. It forms arbuscular mycorrhiza and vesicles in roots. Found in Colombia in soil with native grasses, the species was described as new to science in 1984.

References

Diversisporales
Fungi of Colombia
Fungi described in 1984